Greencreek is an unincorporated community in Idaho County, Idaho, United States,  northeast of Cottonwood.

History
Founded in the 1800s, Greencreek's population was estimated at 50 in 1960.

Description

Greencreek does not have a post office, but has its own ZIP code 83533. Greencreek's elevation is 3189 feet. It is approximately 5.5 miles east of U.S. 95. The town is approximately .4 miles in length and has one "T" intersection in the middle of town. The Greencreek Community Hall is still in use and rented frequently for weddings, community yard sales, Christmas parties, and the annual Fourth of July Celebration. The Greencreek Community Hall has an elected board that serves to oversee the operations and maintenance of the facility. It has received multiple upgrades from revenue generated from the Saint Anthony's Society and grants. It has an upgraded heating and exhaust system, commercial kitchen, and handicapped accessible bathrooms. There is a Catholic church in Greencreek known as Saint Anthony's Parish. As part of the parish there is still an active group called the "Saint Anthony's Society" that serves as a governing board for the church as well as providing community service projects, most notably the Greencreek Fourth of July celebration. A women's group known as the "Altar Society" functions in a similar capacity.

Greencreek also has a 4-H club called the Greencreek Active Workers. It is the oldest active 4-H club in Idaho County. Youth in 4-H primarily take market animals as projects for the fair; however, other projects such as cooking, sewing, welding, etc. are taken. The 4-H club provides community service to the Greencreek area as well, most notably painting the Greencreek "G" on the west side of town, and an annual roadside litter clean-up. Greencreek's primary industry is agriculture; however other small businesses do exist in the area. There is an auto repair shop, known as B and A Performance Auto, and a butcher shop known as Sonnen Meats. Other ancillary businesses exist in Greencreek, such as custom cabinet shops and general contracting businesses. Greencreek is located in the Cottonwood School District #242.

References

External links

Unincorporated communities in Idaho County, Idaho
Unincorporated communities in Idaho